Francisco Javier Errázuriz may refer to:

Francisco Javier Errázuriz Ossa, Chilean Catholic cardinal
Francisco Javier Errázuriz Talavera, Chilean politician